Płatek is a Polish surname, it may refer to:
 Andrew Platek, basketball player North Carolina Tar Heels and Siena Saints
 Andrzej Płatek (pl 1947–2017), Polish footballer and manager
 Artur Płatek (pl, born 1970), Polish footballer and manager
 Dariusz Płatek (born 1966), Polish ice hockey player
 Felka Platek (1899–1944), Polish artist, Auschwitz concentration camp victim
 Krzysztof Płatek (born 1962), Polish athlete
 Monika Płatek (born 1953), Polish criminologist and politician
 Richard Platek, Kripke–Platek set theory
 Robert Platek, Spezia Calcio owner

Other
 Kripke–Platek set theory
 Kripke–Platek set theory with urelements

Polish-language surnames